John Samuel Richardson, Baron Richardson, Bt. LVO FRCP (16 June 1910 – 15 August 2004) was a British physician, President of the General Medical Council, 1973–80, etc.

He trained at, and later worked for St Thomas' Hospital. During his career he attended King George VI and later Harold Macmillan. He was particularly proud of his role as chairman of the Joint Consultants' Committee from 1967 to 1972. He represented the JCC on the so-called Cogwheel Working Party (First Report of the Joint Working Party on the Organisation of Medical Work in Hospitals, 1967).

Richardson was appointed a Member (fourth class) of the Royal Victorian Order (MVO) in 1943, which was reclassified as Lieutenant (LVO) on 31 December 1984. He was knighted in 1960, created a Baronet 'of Ecclesall in the West Riding of Yorkshire' on 20 November 1963. On 2 February 1979 Sir John was created a life peer taking the title Baron Richardson, of Lee in the County of Devon.

He married the artist Sybil Trist in 1933. They remained married until her death in 1991.

References 

1910 births
2004 deaths
Life peers
Baronets in the Baronetage of the United Kingdom
20th-century British medical doctors
Knights Bachelor
Lieutenants of the Royal Victorian Order
Fellows of the Royal College of Physicians
Presidents of the Royal Society of Medicine
Life peers created by Elizabeth II